The Face Men Thailand Season 1 began audition on 30 April 2017 at  at CentralWorld, Bangkok. Kantana Group and Channel 3 held a press conference on 29 June 2017, at Quartier Water Garden in The EmQuartier, Bangkok. Lukkade Metinee, Moo Asava and Peach Pachara served as model coaches and  the winner of The Face Thailand Season 1 served as a host for the first season. The season premiered on 29 July 2017. Contestants will live together in the residence called Artemis Elite and training every week by special guests, such as Personality & Charisma, Performing Skills, Health & Fitness. This reality program will exclusive on air only on LINE TV.

Auditions
The executive producer announced on his Instagram they are open casting for Thai and all nationalities of International Male Model.

Contestants
(ages stated are at start of filming)

Episodes

Episode 1 : Casting 
First aired 29 July 2017

In the first week is to qualify for all 41 people to shoot and the next natural makeup to steer his team to three Mentor, it was decided by a shoot. Contestants from 41 finalists who had to walk around 28 people. In the second round as a model for screening into three teams, Mentor was the decision by walking and the third round to make up for Mentor selected by a team of around 24 people coming through and finalists 18 people.
Team Lukkade : Jack, Niki, Gun, Philip, Mos, Kun.
Team Moo : Thime, Sam, Bank, Mickey, Attila, Third.
Team Peach : Dui, Bas, Gunn, Man, PK, Joseph Angelo.

Episode 2 : Sensitive Side of Men 
First aired 5 August 2017

 Winning coach and team:  Lukkade Metinee
 Bottom two:  Third Yoovichit & Bas Buaphakham
 Eliminated:  Bas Buaphakham

Episode 3 : Walk Your Pets 
First aired 12 August 2017

 Winning coach and team:   Moo Asava
 Bottom two:  Kun Tansuhas & Dui Kanthasai
 Eliminated: Dui Kanthasai
 Special guest: Cris Horwang

Episode 4 : Confident in Love 
First aired 19 August 2017

 Winning coach and team:  Lukkade Metinee
 Bottom two:  Bank Sangnimnuan  & Gunn Saengvanich 
 Eliminated: None
 Special guest: Natthaya Boonchompaisarn

Episode 5 : Locker Room
First aired 26 August 2017

 Winning coach and team:  Moo Asava
 Bottom two:     Gun Phanwong &  PK Vanasirikul
 Eliminated:  Gun Phanwong

Episode 6 : Victory Walk 
First aired 2 September 2017

 Winning coach and team: Lukkade Metinee
 Bottom four: Mickey Na Pombhejara &   Sam Boonhor &   Bank Sangnimnuan & Gunn Saengvanich 
 Eliminated:  Bank Sangnimnuan
 Special guest: Chalita Suansane &

Episode 7 : Newly Wet Couple 
First aired 9 September 2017

 Winning coach and team:  Moo Asava
 Bottom two:  Jack Su &  Gunn Saengvanich
 Eliminated:  Jack Su
 Eliminated outside of the Elimination room:   Niki Boontham, Thime Pichitsurakij & PK Vanasirikul
 Special guest:  , Jazzy Chewter, Maria Hoerschler & Mario Maurer

Episode 8 : Alpha Move by Alpha Men 
First aired 16 September 2017

 Winning coach and team:  Moo Asava
 Bottom two:  Kun Tansuhas & Gunn Saengvanich
 Eliminated:  Kun Tansuhas
 Special mentor:  Mom Rajawongse Srikhumrung Yukol Rattakul

Episode 9 : Body Pose 
First aired 23 September 2017

 Winning coach and team:  Moo Asava & Peach Pachara
 Winning campaign:  Attila Gagnaux & Joseph Angelo
 Final three was chosen by Coach:  Philip Thinroj, Attila Gagnaux & Man Soranun
 Fourth and Fifth final was chosen by coach from winning campaign team:  Third Yoovichit & Joseph Angelo
 Eliminated:  Mos Priabyodying, Sam Boonhor, Mickey Na Pombhejara & Gunn Saengvanich

Episode 10 : Final Walk 

First aired 30 September 2017
 Final five:  Philip Thinroj, Attila Gagnaux, Third Yoovichit, Joseph Angelo & Man Soranun
 Winning campaign: Joseph Angelo
 Eliminated: Third Yoovichit & Joseph Angelo
 Final three: Philip Thinroj, Attila Gagnaux & Man Soranun
 The Face Men Thailand: Philip Thinroj
 Winning coach and team: Lukkade Metinee

Summaries

Elimination Table

 The contestant was part of the winning team for the episode.
 The contestant was at risk of elimination.
 The contestant was eliminated from the competition.
 The contestant was eliminated outside of the elimination room by their mentors.
 The contestant won the campaign for the episode with contestant of other team and selected to the final walk round by their mentors.
 The contestant won the campaign for the episode but was eliminated in the final walk round.
 The contestant was a Runner-Up.
 The contestant won The Face Men.

 Episode 1 was the casting episode. The final eighteen were divided into individual teams of six as they were selected.
 In episode 4, team Lukkade won the campaign. Moo nominated Bank while Peach nominated Gunn for the elimination. Lukkade didn't cut both of them.
 In episode 6, team Lukkade won the campaign. Moo nominated three contestants: Bank, Mickey and Sam at the same time for the elimination. Lukkade decided to cut Bank.
 In episode 7, Lukkade, Moo and Peach were asked to choose any one contestant to eliminate from the remaining from their team. Lukkade chose Niki, Moo chose Thime, and Peach chose PK respectively.
 In episode 8, Mom Rajawongse Srikhumrung Yukol Rattakul (Khun Ying Mangmoom) replaced Moo who was occupied by his illness, but after the campaign, Moo was back to the elimination process as Team Moo's mentor.
 In episode 9, Attila and Joseph Angelo won the campaign individually. Team Moo and Team Peach are automatically allowed to choose another contestant. Lukkade, Moo and Peach were allowed to choose any one contestant to advance into the finale from the remaining nine models. Lukkade chose Philip, Moo chose Attila, and Peach chose Man. After know team Moo and team Peach won a campaign. Moo choose Third and Peach chose Joseph Angelo as a final contestant who allow to a final runway. Mos, Sam, Mickey and Gunn was eliminated.
 In episode 10, Joseph Angelo won the campaign individually, Philip, Attila and Man were put through to the final runway show while Third and Joseph Angelo was eliminated.

Campaigns
 Episode 1: Naked face group shots, Runway and Self Administered 'Transformations' (Casting)
 Episode 2: Sensitive Side of Men for L'Oréal Men Expert Hydra Sensitive
 Episode 3: Walk Your Pets
 Episode 4: Confident in Love for Head & Shoulders
 Episode 5: Locker Room for Cathy Doll by Karmarts
 Episode 6: Victory Walk for GQ Thailand
 Episode 7: Newly Wet Couple for Head & Shoulders Suprême
 Episode 8: Alpha Move by Alpha Men for L'Oréal Men Expert White Active Oil Control, L'Oréal Men Expert Hydra Energetic and L'Oréal Men Expert Vita Lift
 Episode 9: Body Pose for Namu Life SnailWhite Créme Body Wash Natural White, SnailWhite Créme Body Wash Deep Moisture and SnailWhite Créme Body Wash Anti-aging
 Episode 10: Acting and Finalwalk

Official partners
 L'Oréal Men Expert
 Head & Shoulders
 Cathy Doll by Karmarts
 Toyota Corolla Altis
 GQ Thailand
 Bangkok Metro Networks Limited (BMN)
 DNA Skin Clinic

Notes

 [a] PK represented Thailand at 2018 Asia Model Festival Awards (Face of Asia) held in South Korea, were he winning Best Relationship.
 [b] Man represented Thailand at 2018 Asia Model Festival Awards (Face of Asia) held in South Korea, were he winning OnDay Cosmetics Award.

References 

Thailand
2017 Thai television seasons
The Face Thailand seasons
Thai television series based on American television series